Fairfield Intermediate, sometimes shortened to FIS, is a year 7-8 school located in Fairfield, Hamilton, New Zealand. The principal is Angela Walters.

History

The school was founded in 1963 and was and still is the only school in North-East Hamilton that caters to  year 7-8 students. The school has for many years gone to Port Waikato and Pauanui for school camps. This has been changed for the 2013 camps where Pauanui is no longer used for the trips.

Notable alumni

Notable alumni of Fairfield Intermediate include Stan Walker (2002–2003), an actor and Australian Idol-winning singer, and Scott Styris (1987–1988), an all-rounder who has played for the Black Caps and Northern Districts.

Extracurricular activities

Fairfield Intermediate offers many opportunities in sport and music with yearly productions and successful sports teams. Their chess team has traditionally done well, winning many regional tournaments in the past few years. The school sends representatives to the AIMS Games every year and has come out with medals on a large number of occasions. Also the school runs a musical each year, having more than 150 students take part.

Fairfield Cluster

The school is part of the Fairfield Cluster, in which comprises Fairfield Intermediate and its contributing schools, Bankwood, Hukanui, Rototuna, Woodstock, Te Totara. It also includes Southwell School and St Joseph's, Fairfield. The Fairfield Cluster runs many competitions and festivals together including, athletics and choir.

Houses

The school has been traditionally divided into four houses named after the dominant peaks in the North Island; Ruapehu, Ngauruhoe, Tongariro and Taranaki. In 2012 however the house system was abolished due to people in the same class being in different houses, so a new team system was created. The system runs with one team being three or four full classes. The teams are named after New Zealand plants and are named: Nikau, Kauri, Rimu, Kowhai, Totara and Puriri.

References

Schools in Hamilton, New Zealand
Intermediate schools in New Zealand